Billing may refer to:

Invoicing
The process of sending an invoice (a bill) to customers for goods or services
Electronic billing
Medical billing, a payment practice within the United States health system
Telecommunications billing, systems and methods that collect information about calls and other services to be billed to the subscriber

Places
Billing, Northamptonshire
Billing Aquadrome, a leisure park in Great Billing, Northamptonshire
Billing Hall, Northamptonshire
Mount Billing, a mountain in the Antarctic named for Graham Billing
Rawdon Billing, a hill in West Yorkshire

Other uses
Billing (surname)
Billing (birds), a behavior in some birds involving touching and clasping each other's bills
Billing (performing arts), the display of credits for a creative work
Heinz Billing Prize, for the advancement of scientific computation

See also
Billinge (disambiguation)
Billingr, in Norse mythology the father of a maiden desired by Odin
Billings (disambiguation)